Thomas Malcolm Rowe (born 24 September 1988) is an English professional footballer who primarily plays as a winger but can also operate at left back and currently plays for Doncaster Rovers.

Career

Stockport County
Rowe was born in Wythenshawe, Manchester, and started his career as a boy with Manchester United in 2002. He joined the Stockport County youth system the following year, and made his first-team debut as an 81st-minute substitute in their 4–1 defeat away at Watford in the FA Cup third round in January 2007. He scored his first goal for Stockport against Notts County at Edgeley Park in February 2008, and followed this up with a hat-trick at Rotherham United a few days later, which prompted Stockport County manager Jim Gannon to say, "Physically, he is a supreme athlete with Premier League fitness and technically he is excellent. What an accomplished performance – the only thing is maybe the England scouts won't come to look at him. I've said it to him personally, I think he has a great future." Rowe made 30 appearances in the 2007–08 season, including all the playoff games, as Stockport won promotion to League One. At the end of the season, Rowe won the club's Young Player of the Year Award.

He made a further 50 appearances for Stockport in the 2008–09 season.

Peterborough United
After Stockport went into administration at the end of April 2009, the administrators sold Rowe to raise necessary funding for the club. Rowe joined League One side Peterborough United for £225,000 on a three-year contract in May 2009. He scored his first goal for Peterborough in a 4–0 win away at Wycombe in the first round of the League Cup at the beginning of the 2009–10 season. After becoming a regular player in the Peterborough team, Rowe ended the 2010/11 campaign by scoring the opening goal at a 3–0 win over Huddersfield Town in the League One play-off final as they won promotion to the Football League Championship.

Rowe was appointed Peterborough's captain for the 2012–13 season but the team ended up suffering relegation despite reaching 54 points. He remained with the Posh for a further season back in League One, during which he lifted the Football League Trophy after a 3–1 win over Chesterfield. However, following a play-off defeat to Leyton Orient, Rowe was named as one of a series of players who would not be offered a new contract. In total he made 199 appearances for the club, scoring 27 times.

Wolverhampton Wanderers
Out of contract at Peterborough, Rowe signed a two-year deal on 3 June 2014 with newly promoted Championship side Wolverhampton Wanderers. After overcoming a broken toe sustained during pre-season, he made his club debut on 30 August 2014 as a substitute in a 3–1 win against Blackburn. Rowe failed to establish himself in Wolves' first team, primarily appearing only as a substitute before breaking a bone in his foot on Boxing Day 2014 and undergoing surgery. A recurrence of the problem meant he failed to play again during the season.

Rowe made a solitary League Cup appearance for Wolves during the start of the 2015–16 campaign before being loaned out in October to League One Scunthorpe United for several months. After making three appearances for his parent club in late February 2016, he was again loaned out, joining Doncaster Rovers on loan until the end of the season linking up with former manager Darren Ferguson. He made his début later on that day in a 2–1 home defeat to his former club Peterborough United but was unable to stop the team being relegated.

At the conclusion of the season his parent club announced they would not be renewing Rowe's contract. He had made 18 appearances for the club over two years.

Doncaster Rovers

On 18 May 2016, Rowe signed a permanent 3-year deal at League Two Side Doncaster Rovers, becoming Ferguson's first summer signing.

He was offered a new contract by Doncaster at the end of the 2018–19 season.

Bristol City
On 1 July 2019 Rowe signed a two-year contract with Championship side Bristol City.

on 14 May 2021, Rowe left Bristol City due to his contract expiring.

Return To Doncaster Rovers

on 23 June 2021, it was announced that Rowe had rejoined Doncaster Rovers.

Personal life
Tommy's younger brother, Danny, is also a professional footballer.

Career statistics

Honours
Stockport County
Football League Two play-offs: 2007–08

Peterborough United
Football League One play-offs: 2010–11
Football League Trophy: 2013–14
Individual

 Doncaster Rovers Player of the Year: 2021–22

References

External links

1988 births
Living people
People from Wythenshawe
Association football wingers
English footballers
Manchester United F.C. players
Stockport County F.C. players
Peterborough United F.C. players
Wolverhampton Wanderers F.C. players
Doncaster Rovers F.C. players
English Football League players